On 28 June 1998 a referendum on a new abortion law was conducted in Portugal; it was the second national referendum in the Portuguese history and the first after the 1974 Carnation Revolution. The law was proposed by the Portuguese Communist Party and it decriminalized abortion during the first ten weeks of pregnancy and was considered by the left as the only way to put an end to the estimated 20 to 50 thousand illegal abortions in the country. The law was approved in the Assembly of the Republic through a majority of the center-left and left-wing parties, but an agreement between the Socialist Party and the Social Democratic Party parties leaders led to the referendum.

The referendum was held on a summer day, which is said to have contributed to the fact that the turnout was so low that it did not pass the threshold of 50 percent of the voters needed to make the decision binding, although the winning answer, NO, was respected and the law was not changed, meaning abortion was only allowed in exceptional case (such as rape, mal-formations of the fetus and danger to the women's health). In the following years, a few dozen women (a small minority of the estimated illegal abortions) were defendants in three trials for abortion.

A revote occurred in the 2007 Portuguese abortion referendum, where the result was reversed.

The question present in the ballots was: "Do you agree with the decriminalization of the voluntary interruption of the pregnancy, if it takes place in the first 10 weeks and in an authorized healthcare institution?"

Political positions
The major parties in Portugal at the time listed with their political positioning and their official answer to the referendum question:

 Left
 Portuguese Communist Party - YES
 Ecologist Party "The Greens" - YES
 Socialist Party - NEUTRAL (most of the party said YES, however, important members, including the General-Secretary and Prime-Minister António Guterres said NO)
 Right
 Social Democratic Party - NEUTRAL
 People's Party - NO

Opinion polling
All polls published showed an advantage for the YES side, but official results showed a 51% to 49% win for the NO side. Late deciders and a low turnout may explain this result. Note, until 2000, the publication of opinion polls in the last week of the campaign was forbidden.

Results

Results by district

References
General

Specific

See also
 Abortion by country

Abortion in Portugal
Referendums in Portugal
1998 referendums
Abortion referendum
June 1998 events in Europe
Abortion referendums